WKXX (102.9 FM) is a radio station licensed to the community of Attalla, Alabama, United States. The station is owned by Broadcast Media LLC. WKXX broadcasts a classic country music format to the greater Gadsden, Alabama area.

History
This station received its original construction permit from the Federal Communications Commission on June 10, 1991. The new station was assigned the call letters WKXX by the FCC on July 12, 1991. WKXX received its license to cover from the FCC on June 1, 1992.

In October 1992, Kerry Rich contracted to sell this station to Alexandra Victoria Broadcasting Company, Inc. The deal was approved by the FCC on November 20, 1992, and the transaction was consummated the same day.

In November 1997, Alexandra Victoria Broadcasting Company, Inc., made a deal to sell this station to Broadcast Media LLC. The deal was approved by the FCC on January 16, 1998, and the transaction was consummated on April 3, 1998.

On August 11, 2020 WKXX changed its format from hot adult contemporary music to sports, branded as Fox Sports 102.9.

On January 16, 2023 WKXX changed their format from sports to classic country.

References

External links

KXX
Classic country radio stations in the United States
Etowah County, Alabama
Fox Sports Radio stations